The effects of Hurricane Georges in Florida lasted for more than a week in late September and early October in 1998. After developing from a tropical wave to the south of Cape Verde on September 15, Georges moved steadily west-northwestward and peaked as a strong Category 4 hurricane on the Saffir–Simpson scale on September 20. After weakening slightly to a Category 3, the cyclone proceeded to strike Antigua, Saint Kitts and Nevis, Puerto Rico, Dominican Republic, and Cuba. Georges emerged into the Straits of Florida as a Category 1, but re-strengthened slightly to a Category 2 before making landfall in Key West, Florida, on September 25. The hurricane continued northwestward into the Gulf of Mexico and struck near Biloxi, Mississippi, on September 28. After moving inland, Georges turned eastward and crossing into the Florida Panhandle on the next day. By October 1, the system dissipated near the northeast Florida–southeast Georgia coast.

With a landfall predicted along the mainland of Florida, the National Hurricane Center (NHC) issued tropical cyclone warnings and watches, while more than 1.2 million people were ordered to evacuate. Strong winds left all of the Florida Keys without electricity. Georges damaged 1,536 houses and destroyed 173 homes throughout the island chain, many of which were mobile homes. The Florida Keys reported about $200 million in damage. While approaching landfall in Mississippi, Georges generated storm surge and abnormally high tides along the coast of the Florida Panhandle, causing erosion and coastal flooding near the west end of the state. The cyclone also spawned 17 tornadoes in the state, the most since Agnes in 1972. Georges caused five deaths and at least $340 million in damage in Florida.

After the storm, the name Georges was retired and removed from the Atlantic hurricane naming list. A disaster declaration allowed residents of the Florida Keys and 12 counties in the Florida Panhandle to receive aid through the Federal Emergency Management Agency.

Background

Hurricane Georges began as a tropical wave that moved off the coast of Africa during mid-September 1998. Tracking westward, the wave spawned an area of low pressure two days later, which quickly strengthened into a tropical depression. On September 16, the depression was upgraded into Tropical Storm Georges and further into Hurricane Georges the next day.

Over the following five days, the hurricane tracked through the Greater Antilles, causing over 600 fatalities, mainly in the Dominican Republic and Haiti. By September 25, Georges entered the Gulf of Mexico as a Category 2 hurricane. Upon landfall, the hurricane's forward motion slowed to an eastward drift. Georges dissipated on October 1 near the Atlantic coast of Florida.

Preparations
Initial forecasts of a southeastern Florida landfall resulted in the evacuation of over 1.2 million residents, including much of the Florida Keys. Despite the mandatory evacuation order, 20,000 people, including over 7,000 Key West citizens, refused to leave. Some of those who remained to ride out the storm were shrimpers, whose boats were their entire livelihood. Insurance companies refused to insure some of the older shrimp boats, leading shrimpers to ride it out with all they had left. Due to lack of law enforcement, those who stayed in Key West went through red lights, double-parked, and disobeyed traffic laws. Long-time Florida Keys citizens noted the solitude of the time and enjoyed the island for how it once was, rather than the large crowds of tourists. In Miami-Dade, 100,000 residents evacuated from coastal areas, 13,000 of which stayed in local shelters.

Impact

South and Central Florida

The eye of the storm passed near Key West about midday on September 24. Wind gusts near the center of the storm reached . Strong winds downed palm trees and power lines, leaving all of the Keys without power. Georges's waves overturned 2 boats in Key West, damaged 1,536 houses, and destroyed 173 homes, many of which were mobile homes. Damage in the Florida Keys amounted to $200 million.

A long-tracked F0 tornado, originally forming as a waterspout, moved from Key Biscayne to Cutler Ridge. The tornado downed trees and power lines and left some damage to cars and homes. Another F0 tornado briefly touched down in Bal Harbour and left similar damage. Strong winds knocked down power lines, leaving about 200,000 people without power in the Miami area. In Palm Beach County, more than 10,000 Florida Power & Light customers lost electricity on September 25, though power was restored for most of them by nightfall.

On September 25, a waterspout moved onshore near Sebastian and severely damaged a factory. Rated an F1, the tornado caused about $700,000 in damages. Thunderstorm winds associated with Georges left sporadic wind damage along the west coast of Florida. In DeSoto County, a weak and short-lived tornado near Arcadia damaged some tree limbs and trees before lifting. A few homes experienced flood damage as a result. Georges spawned two brief tornadoes in Polk County. The first twister damaged awnings, blew over a few sheds, and downed large trees limbs and power lines just south of Winter Haven. Another tornado touched down in Hillsborough County near Lutz. However, it lifted before causing any damage.

Florida Panhandle
Outer squalls produced a tornado outbreak of 28 twisters, most of which occurred in northwestern Florida.

Near Panama City, rough seas broke through the seawall and inundated waterfront buildings. Strong winds blew the roofs off several structures in the city. An F1 tornado damaged several homes, causing $300,000 in damages, in Okaloosa County. In Calhoun County flooding isolated up to 20 homes and roads were severely damaged. Widespread flooding in Walton County damaged numerous homes and businesses. Flash flooding from local creeks inundated numerous homes, leaving $500,000 in damages. High water near a levee threatened to break through and inundate a small town, resulting in the evacuation of 100 residents. Officials shut down 132 roads, including Interstate 10 due to flooding. Six homes were damaged in Gadsden County and many were left without power. Thirty roads and 20 bridges were washed out in Holmes County and an emergency evacuation of 300 residents was required. A chicken farm was flooded and 48,000 chickens drowned. Damages to roadways in the county amounted to $1.3 million. Flooding in Washington County caused $750,000 in damages to roads.

Flooding in Jackson and Jefferson Counties shut down several roads and high winds downed numerous trees. Street flooding occurred throughout Tallahassee and many trees were downed. One tree fell on a power line and cut power to 1,800 residences in the city. A brief F1 tornado in Bay County damaged 23 homes, causing $250,000 in damages. Another F1 tornado caused substantial damage to a church and injured one person. Numerous creeks and rivers rose near or above flood stage throughout northern Florida due to the torrential rainfall from Georges. A strong F2 tornado touched down in Suwannee County, destroying seven homes and damaging five others. Five people were injured, two of which sustained serious injuries, and damages from the tornado amounted to $600,000.

Damage amounted to $100 million (1998 USD, $127 million 2009 USD), though no deaths were reported.

Aftermath

See also

Hurricane Georges
1998 Atlantic hurricane season

References

External links
 NHC Georges Report

Hurricane Georges
Hurricanes in Florida
1998 in Florida
Georges